Paul George (born 1990) is an American basketball player.

Paul George may also refer to:  

Paul George (environmentalist), Canadian author and politician 
Paul George (footballer) (born 1994), Northern Irish footballer
Paul "Pinkie" George (1905–1993), American professional wrestling promoter, boxer and businessman
Paul George (horticulturalist) (1841–1921), recipient of Victoria Medal of Honour

See also

George Paul (disambiguation)
Nikhil Paul George, Indian artist
Paul St George, British artist
Paul Georges (1923–2002), American artist